Yvon Mariolle (29 April 1946 – 8 November 1999) was a French boxer. He competed in the men's welterweight event at the 1968 Summer Olympics.

References

1946 births
1999 deaths
French male boxers
Olympic boxers of France
Boxers at the 1968 Summer Olympics
Sportspeople from Orléans
Welterweight boxers